"Thicker Than Blood" is a song co-written and recorded by American country music artist Garth Brooks.  It was released in May 2002 as the fourth single from the album Scarecrow.  The song reached number 18 on the Billboard Hot Country Singles & Tracks chart.  It was written by Brooks and Jenny Yates.

Background and writing
According to the liner notes, the song is about Brooks's father, who served in the United States Marine Corps. Brooks also said that he did not want to refer to his father as an "ex-Marine", but could not find any other way to describe him while fitting the song's meter.

Chart performance
"Thicker Than Blood" debuted at number 58 on the Hot Country Singles & Tracks chart dated December 1, 2001, based on unsolicited airplay following the album's release. The song officially re-entered at number 60 on the chart dated June 15, 2002.

References

2002 singles
2001 songs
Garth Brooks songs
Songs written by Garth Brooks
Capitol Records Nashville singles
Song recordings produced by Allen Reynolds